Gonzalo Casco (1533–c.1588) was a Spanish military leader and conquistador of Paraguay.

Biography 

Casco was born in Aviles. After being established in Peru, he arrived in Asunción, in the expedition of Ñuflo de Chaves. Time later it held honorary positions in the city, serving like Alcalde in 1574, and Regidor in 1568, 1575 and 1578.

Under the orders of Nufrio de Chaves, Gonzalo Casco participated in the expeditions against the tribes of Mayáes and Tomacocis, native inhabitants of Paraguayan territory.

He was married to María de Mendoza Irala, daughter of Gonzalo de Mendoza, interim governor of the Río de la Plata between 1556-1558, and Isabel de Irala, daughter of Domingo Martínez de Irala.

References 

People from Asunción
16th-century Spanish nobility
16th-century explorers
16th-century Spanish military personnel
Spanish colonial governors and administrators
1533 births
Year of death unknown